This is a list of goat breeds usually considered to have developed in Canada and the United States. The goat is not indigenous to North America, so none of them is exclusively American.

References 

 
Goat